The 2006 Ladies' International Rules Series was the first and, as of 2019, the only ladies' International rules football series played between Ireland and Australia. The series was played at the same time as the men's 2006 International Rules Series. Ireland won the series, winning the first test at Breffni Park by 134–15 and the second test at Parnell Park by 39–18. The series was broadcast live by TG4 and Setanta Sports.

Background

TG4 anniversary
In 2006 TG4 was celebrating its 10th anniversary and they asked the Ladies' Gaelic Football Association for suggestions to help mark the occasion. The LGFA subsequently approached AFL Victoria's female development manager, Nicole Graves, about the possibility of a ladies' international rules series.

Rules
In March 2006 officials from the Ladies' Gaelic Football Association and Women's Football Australia met in Singapore to agree a set of rules for the test series. The LGFA were in Singapore for their 2006 All Stars tour. There were a number of differences from the men's game. Fewer steps were allowed than in the men's game. Players were not allowed to call a mark in the middle of the field. Instead, a mark was only allowed inside both 45 metre lines. This was intended to see more flow in the game. The scoring system and use of the round ball remained the same as in the men's game. The Australian-style tackle was not allowed in the women's series.

Series

First test

Second test

Squads

References

Australia women's international rules football team
Ireland women's international rules football team
2006 in Ladies' Gaelic football
2006 in Australian women's sport
2006 in Australian rules football
Ladies
International sports competitions hosted by Ireland
October 2006 sports events in Europe
November 2006 sports events in Europe